The 2015 Doncaster Metropolitan Borough Council election took place on 7 May 2015 to elect all members of Doncaster Council in England. This was on the same day as other local elections. Due to boundary changes all 55 seats were up for election.

The election resulted in the Labour Party retaining control of the council, with a majority of 27 seats.

Result
This result had the following consequences for the total number of seats on the council after the elections:

Ward results
The electoral division results are listed below.

Spoilt ballots are not included in the below results.

Adwick and Carcroft ward

Armthorpe ward

Balby South ward

Bentley ward

Bessacarr and Cantley ward

Conisbrough ward

Edenthorpe and Kirk Sandall ward

Edlington and Warmsworth ward

Finningley ward

Hatfield ward

Hexthorpe and Balby North ward

Mexborough ward

Norton and Askern ward

Roman Ridge ward

Rossington and Bawtry ward

Sprotbrough ward

Stainforth and Barnby Dun ward

Thorne and Moorends ward

Tickhill and Wadworth ward

Town ward

Wheatley Hills and Intake ward

References

2015 English local elections
May 2015 events in the United Kingdom
2015
2010s in South Yorkshire